Skin care is a range of practices that support skin integrity, enhance its appearance, and relieve skin conditions.

Skin care may also refer to

 Cosmetics, care substances used to enhance the appearance or odor of the human body
 Dermatology, a medical subspecialty
 Kangaroo care, or skin-to-skin care, a newborn care technique
 Natural skin care, the use of natural ingredients and traditional medicine in skin care